William Burns (1907 – after 1931) was a footballer who played in the Football League for Stockport County and Stoke City.

Career
Burns was born in Durham and played for Crook Town before joining Stoke in 1930. He scored twice on his debut against Preston North End but was never given a chance by Tom Mather and left for Stockport County at the end of the 1930–31 season. He played six matches for Stockport and had a failed spell with Rotherham United and so Burns decided to pursue a different career.

Career statistics

References

1907 births
Year of death missing
Sportspeople from Durham, England
Footballers from County Durham
English footballers
Association football forwards
Crook Town A.F.C. players
Rotherham United F.C. players
Stoke City F.C. players
Stockport County F.C. players
English Football League players